John Wilson (born Edinburgh, Scotland, 1951) is a Canadian author.

Biography 

Wilson was born in Edinburgh, Scotland on August 3, 1951. He grew up on the Island of Skye, and in Paisley.

After university, where he obtained a degree in Geology, Wilson worked as a geologist in Zimbabwe, before moving to Canada. For nine years, he worked for the Alberta Geological Survey in Edmonton.

In 1989, Wilson wrote an article that was published by The Globe and Mail. Wilson writes historical fiction and non-fiction. He is the author of over 30 books, 300 articles and essays, and 30 poems.
Wilson now lives in Lantzville on Vancouver Island.

Bibliography

Fiction
 Across Frozen Seas
 Ghosts of James Bay
 Adrift in Time
 Red Goodwin
 Lost Cause big simmus
 Shot at Dawn 
 Death on the River
 Germania
 Where Soldiers Lie
 And in the morning...Published February 1, 2003 by Kids Can Press  (first published November 8, 2002) 
 The Alchemist's Dream
 Flames of the Tiger
 Four Steps to Death
 Lost in Spain
 Dancing Elephants and Floating Continents
 The Flags of War
 Battle Scars
 Graves of Ice
 Bones
 Wings of War
Trilogies
 Desert Legends
 Written in Blood
 Ghost Moon
 Victorio's War
 Heretic's Secret
 Crusade / Heretic
 Quest / Grail
 Rebirth
 Weet
 Weet
 Weet's Quest
 Weet Alone
The Ruined City

Non-Fiction
 World At War Trilogy
 Desperate Glory
 Failed Hope: The Story of the Lost Peace
 Bitter Ashes: The Story of WWII
 Discovering the Arctic: The Story of John Rae
 Righting Wrongs: The Story of Norman Bethune
 Norman Bethune: A Life of Passionate Conviction
 John Franklin: Traveller on Undiscovered Seas

References

People from the Isle of Skye
Canadian children's writers
1951 births
Writers from Edinburgh
Scottish emigrants to Canada
Naturalized citizens of Canada
People from the Regional District of Nanaimo
Writers from British Columbia
Living people
Writers from Paisley, Renfrewshire